Aleksandr Aleksandrovich Sokolov (born 4 November 1975) is a retired Russian professional footballer. He played in Belarusian Premier League clubs Naftan-Devon Novopolotsk and Darida Minsk Raion as well for several Russian lower-division clubs.

References

External links
 
 Profile at teams.by

1975 births
Living people
People from Kursk Oblast
Soviet footballers
Russian footballers
Association football forwards
FC Avangard Kursk players
FC Kristall Smolensk players
FC Naftan Novopolotsk players
FC Salyut Belgorod players
FC Arsenal Tula players
FC Darida Minsk Raion players
Hapoel Ironi Kiryat Shmona F.C. players
Belarusian Premier League players
Russian Premier League players
Liga Leumit players
Russian expatriate footballers
Russian expatriate sportspeople in Belarus
Russian expatriate sportspeople in Israel
Expatriate footballers in Belarus
Expatriate footballers in Israel
Sportspeople from Kursk Oblast